Den glade enke i Trangvik (English: The Merry Widow of Trangvik) is a 1927 Norwegian silent drama film directed by Harry Ivarson. The movie is based on the content of Jacob Hilditch's satirical newspaper Trangviksposten.

References

External links
 
 

1927 films
1927 drama films
Norwegian silent films
Films directed by Harry Ivarson
Norwegian black-and-white films
Norwegian drama films
Silent drama films
1920s Norwegian-language films